Suheli may refer to:
Suheli Par, an uninhabited atoll in the Lakshadweep, India
Suheli River, a river in Uttar Pradesh, India